Oregocerata medioloba is a species of moth of the family Tortricidae. It is found in Zamora-Chinchipe Province, Ecuador.

The wingspan is 23 mm. The ground colour of the forewings is cream, tinged with pale brownish. The ground colour is whiter in the basal half of the wing. The strigulation (fine streaks) and dots are brownish. The hindwings are cream, tinged with yellowish posteriorly.

Etymology
The species name refers to the median lobe of the dorsum of the transtilla.

References

Moths described in 2008
Euliini